Hydracarbazine is a pyridazine that has found use as an antihypertensive agent.

References
 

Antihypertensive agents
Pyridazines
Hydrazines
Carboxamides